Julio Gerardo "Gérard" Hernandez (born 20 January 1933) is a Spanish-born French actor.

Biography 
Hernandez was born in Valladolid, Spain and was naturalized French only in 1975. He is mostly famous for his mustache and for having voiced several live-action/cartoon characters, including Gonzo in the French dubbed version of The Muppet Show, Professor Moriarty in the French dubbed version of Sherlock Hound, Papa Smurf and Grouchy Smurf in the French dubbed version of The Smurfs (1981) and the film of the same name.

In films, he only had supporting roles. He is famous for his collaboration with Jean-Pierre Marielle and Philippe Noiret in the French film Coup de Torchon (1981) directed by Bertrand Tavernier.

He was famous on television in the 1970s and 1980s, where he was a regular guest in game shows like Les Jeux de 20 heures on FR3 and L'Académie des neuf on Antenne 2. He also hosted the game show Les Affaires sont les Affaires on Canal+ in the mid-1980s.

He has also voiced Franz Sanchez (Robert Davi) in the French dubbed version of James Bond film Licence to Kill (1989).

He portrays the regular role of Commissaire Perret in the French TV series Père et Maire from 2002 to 2009. He plays Raymond in the sitcom Scènes de Ménages since 2009 on M6.

Filmography

Films 
La Meilleure Part (1955) ... Gonzalez
Méfiez-vous fillettes (1957) ... hotel customer
The Lovers of Montparnasse (1957)
The Hole (1960) ... a prisoner
La Belle Américaine (1961) ... Gruau, a policeman
Le Crime ne paie pas (1961) ... witness of accident
Les Combinards (1966) ... abbot
Le Cerveau (1968) ... an agent
Les Gaspards (1974) ... Hervé Balzac, police inspector
Attention les yeux! (1976) ... restaurant owner
D'amour et d'eau fraîche (1976) ... Ben
Cours après moi que je t'attrape (1976) ... Grandpré
 The Porter from Maxim's (1976) ... Hernandez
Bobby Deerfield (1977) ... Carlos Del Montanara
La Nuit, tous les chats sont gris (1977) ... bistrot owner
Les Ringards (1978) ... prison governor
Coup de tête (1979) ... inspector
C'est pas moi, c'est lui (1979) ... pottery seller
Rodriguez au pays des merguez (1980) ... Gongormatz
Signé Furax (1980) ... Asti Spumante
Coup de Torchon (1981) ... Leonelli
Sanguine (1988) ... Alvaro
L'Invité surprise (1988) ... casino owner
La Femme du cosmonaute (1998) ... Professor Klavel
La Dilettante (1999) ... police inspector
A Crime in Paradise (2000) ... Jacky

Television 
Les Cinq Dernières Minutes (1960) ... building painter (1 episode)
Les Évasions célèbres (1972) ... Mazarin (1 episode)
Le Temps des as (mini-series) (1978) ... Bachereau
Le Roi qui vient du Sud (1979) ... Concini
Toutes griffes dehors (1982) ... Simonès
Commissaire Moulin (1989) ... José Ribeira (1 episode)
C'est quoi ce petit boulot? (1991) ... Ben
Bonnes Vacances (1998) ... Legendre
La Surprise (2000) ... Philippe Charbier
Père et Maire (2002–09) ... Commissaire Perret
Mer belle à agitée (TV film) (2004) ... Albert
Scènes de Ménages (2009–present) ... Raymond

Voice actor

Film dubbings 
Tom Jones (1963) ... Black George (Wilfrid Lawson)
Reflections in a Golden Eye (1967) ... Anacleto
Shalako (1968) ... Rojas (Julián Mateos)
The Wild Bunch (1969) ... Angel (Jaime Sánchez)
Guns of the Magnificent Seven (1969) ... Keno (Monte Markham)
The Love Bug (1969) ... hippie (Robert Foulk)
Mackenna's Gold (1969) ... Colorado (Omar Sharif)
Little Big Man (1970) ... historian (William Hickey)
Chisum (1970) ... Neemo
Cannon for Cordoba (1970) ... Andy Rice (Pete Duel
Wild Rovers (1971) ... Sheriff Bill Jackson (Victor French)
Delusions of Grandeur (1971) ... Giuseppe (Leopoldo Trieste)
Deliverance (1972) ... mountain man (Bill McKinney)
The New Centurions (1972) ... Sergio (Erik Estrada)
My Name is Nobody (1973) ... corral owner
The Stone Killer (1973) ... garagist
The Taking of Pelham One Two Three (1974) ... a thug
Thunderbolt and Lightfoot (1974) ... Goody (Geoffrey Lewis)
Rosebud (1975) ... Hamlekh (Cliff Gorman)
The Man Who Would Be King (1975) ... Billy Fish (Saeed Jaffrey)
Brannigan (1975) ...  Angell (Arthur Batanides)
Supervixens (1975) ... Cal MacKinney (John LaZar)
Taxi Driver (1976) ... grocer (Victor Argo)
Annie Hall (1977) ... Alvy's uncle
Cross of Iron (1977) ... Caporal Schnurrbart
The Lord of the Rings (1978) ... Gollum (Peter Woodthorpe), Wormtongue (Michael Deacon)
Odds and Evens (1978) ... Nynfus (Sal Borgese)
Up in Smoke (1978) ... Pedro de Pacas (Cheech Marin)
Apocalypse Now (1979) ... photographer (Dennis Hopper)
Manhattan (1979) ... pizzeria waiter (Raymond Serra)
Stir Crazy (1980) ... Skip Donahue (Gene Wilder)
Heavy Metal (1981) ... robot (John Candy)
The Bunker (1981) ... Joseph Goebbels (Cliff Gorman)
Romancing the Stone (1984) ... Juan (Alfonso Arau)
Firewalker (1986) ... cantina owner
Tin Men (1987) ... Ernest Tilley (Danny DeVito)
Harry and the Hendersons (1987) ... Jacques LaFleur (David Suchet)
Licence to Kill (1989) ... Franz Sanchez (Robert Davi)
The Karate Kid Part III (1989) ... Mr Miyagi (Pat Morita)
Do the Right Thing (1989) ... Pino (John Turturro)

TV series 
I Dream of Jeannie (1965) ... Major Anthony Nelson (Larry Hagman)
Kojak (1973–78) ... Inspector Gomez
Starsky and Hutch (1975) ... Mickey
The Love Boat (1977) ... Doctor Adam Bricker (Bernie Kopell)
Man from Atlantis (1978) ... Moby
Message from Space: Galactic Wars (1979) ... Sidero
Miami Vice (1984–89) ... Lieutenant Rodriguez
ALF (1986–90) ... Willie Tanner (Max Wright)

Animated series 
The Flintstones (1960–66) ... Barney
The Muppet Show (1977) ... Gonzo, Waldorf, Rowlf
The Secret Lives of Waldo Kitty (1979) ... Waldo
Around the World with Willy Fog (1981) ... Bully and Tico
The Smurfs (1981) ... Papa Smurf, Grouchy Smurf
Dogtanian and the Three Muskehounds (1981) ... Dogtanian
ThunderCats (1985) ... Mongor, Claudus
Seabert (1985) ... Sulfuric
Maeterlinck's Blue Bird: Tyltyl and Mytyl's Adventurous Journey (1986) ... Tylo, narrator
Fireman Sam (1987) ... Commandant Steele
Babar (1989) ... Cornelius
Chip 'n Dale Rescue Rangers (1989–90) ... additional voices
Darkwing Duck (1991) ... Darkwing Duck
Albert the Fifth Musketeer (1993) ... D'Artagnan
Iznogoud (1995) ... Iznogoud
101 Dalmatians: The Series (1997) ... Jasper, Mayor Edmond, Sydney, Sergeant Tibs

Animated films 
Tintin and the Temple of the Sun (1969) ... chief of train station
The Twelve Tasks of Asterix (1976) ... Le Vénérable du sommet
La Ballade des Dalton (1977) ... Jack Dalton
The Rescuers (1977) ... the muskrat
The Castle of Cagliostro (1979) ... Jigen
The Fox and the Hound (1981) ... Badger
Les Dalton en cavale (1983) ... Jack Dalton
Oliver & Company (1988) ... Tito
The Little Mermaid (1989) ... Eureka
Porco Rosso (1992) ... Paolo Piccolo
Bambi (1993) ... Owl
Lady and the Tramp (1997) ... Joe
Atlantis: The Lost Empire (2000) ... Jebidiah Allardyce "Cookie" Farnsworth
Chicken Run (2000) ... Pick
Shrek (2001) ... the priest
Atlantis: Milo's Return (2003) ... Cookie
The Land Before Time (2005) ... narrator
The Smurfs (2011) ... Papa Smurf
The Smurfs 2 (2013) ... Papa Smurf

Theater 
Comedian
La Guerre du sucre (1957), Théâtre des Bouffes-Parisiens
Trencavel (1962), Théâtre Montparnasse
Les Papas naissent dans les armoires (1978), Théâtre de la Michodière
Le Système Ribadier (1986), Théâtre La Bruyère
3 partout (1981), Théâtre des Variétés
Sans rancune (1992), Théâtre du Palais-Royal
Le Dîner de cons (1994), Théâtre des Variétés
La Surprise (1999), Théâtre Saint-Georges
Grosse Chaleur (2004), Théâtre de la Renaissance
Toc-Toc (2012), tour

Stage director
La Peau du personnage (2005), Le Funambule Montmartre

Awards and nominations 
Molière Award for Best Supporting Actor for Sans rancune, 1992
Molière Award for Best Supporting Actor for Le Dîner de cons, 1994
Grand Prix Award for Best Actor of Sitcom for Scènes de Ménages, 2012

References

External links 
 
 
 

1933 births
Living people
French male film actors
French male television actors
French male voice actors
Naturalized citizens of France
People from Valladolid
Spanish emigrants to France
Spanish male film actors
Spanish male television actors
Spanish male voice actors
20th-century French male actors
21st-century French male actors
20th-century Spanish male actors
21st-century Spanish male actors